Niwat Srisawat (Thai นิวัฒน์ ศรีสวัสดิ์), or his nickname Tong (born 19 August 1947) is a Thai former football player who represented the Thailand national team from 1967 to 1979. He was the striker who is the all-time top goalscorer of the national team with his 55 goals.

Niwat retired from Thailand national team on 2 December 1976 after he played the match against South Korea which Thailand win 1–0 in King's Cup. From the past to the present, Niwat was mentioned in dispatches as the legend striker of Thailand national football team.

References 

1947 births
Niwat Srisawat
Living people
Footballers at the 1968 Summer Olympics
Niwat Srisawat
Niwat Srisawat
Footballers at the 1970 Asian Games
Niwat Srisawat
Southeast Asian Games medalists in football
Niwat Srisawat
Footballers at the 1978 Asian Games
Association football wingers
Competitors at the 1967 Southeast Asian Peninsular Games
Niwat Srisawat
Niwat Srisawat
Niwat Srisawat